Quintela is a civil parish in the municipality of Sernancelhe, Portugal. The population in 2011 was 294, in an area of 13.77 km2.

References

Populated places in Viseu District
Freguesias of Sernancelhe